The 12th Mieczysław Połukard Criterium of Polish Speedway League Aces was the 1993 version of the Mieczysław Połukard Criterium of Polish Speedway Leagues Aces. It took place on March 21 in the Polonia Stadium in Bydgoszcz, Poland.

Final standings

Sources 
 Roman Lach - Polish Speedway Almanac

See also 

Criterium of Aces
Mieczysław Połukard Criterium of Polish Speedway Leagues Aces
Miec